The RN-4 National Highway is the shortest national highway of Djibouti.

Roads in Djibouti